Véronique Trinquet (born 15 June 1956) is a French fencer. She won a silver medal in the women's team foil event at the 1976 Summer Olympics.

Her younger sister Pascale Trinquet is also a former fencer and Olympic medalist. Véronique and Pascale are the daughters of a Saint-Tropez retail pharmacist, and after their sporting career was over, they owned a pharmacy in Paris 16th arrondissement.

References

External links
 

1956 births
Living people
Sportspeople from Marseille
French female foil fencers
Olympic fencers of France
Fencers at the 1976 Summer Olympics
Olympic silver medalists for France
Olympic medalists in fencing
Medalists at the 1976 Summer Olympics